Anolis alumina, the Barahona grass anole or shiny anole, is a species of lizard in the family Dactyloidae. The species is found in  Hispaniola.

References

Anoles
Reptiles of Haiti
Reptiles of the Dominican Republic
Reptiles described in 1976
Taxa named by Andreas Hertz